The 2011 Duel in the Pool was a swimming meet held December 16 and 17, 2011 at the Georgia Tech Aquatics Center in Atlanta. It was a short course (25m), dual meet between a team from the United States and a European All-Star team featuring swimmers from 18 nations. It was the sixth meet held under the Duel in the Pool name and the second between the United States and a European team.

The United States prevailed by 181½ points to 80½.

Roster

United States 
The United States team featured 17 men and 18 women.

Men
 Mike Alexandrov
 Ricky Berens
 Tyler Clary
 Conor Dwyer
 Jimmy Feigen
 Mark Gangloff
 Matt Grevers
 Brendan Hansen
 Michael Klueh
 Ryan Lochte
 Tyler McGill
 Matt McLean
 Eric Shanteau
 Davis Tarwater
 Nick Thoman
 Peter Vanderkaay
 Garrett Weber-Gale

Women
 Amanda Beard
 Elizabeth Beisel
 Elaine Breeden
 Natalie Coughlin
 Missy Franklin
 Katy Freeman
 Jessica Hardy
 Kathleen Hersey
 Katie Hoff
 Dagny Knutson
 Elizabeth Pelton
 Julia Smit
 Rebecca Soni
 Ashley Steenvoorden
 Chloe Sutton
 Dana Vollmer
 Amanda Weir
 Kate Ziegler

European All-Stars 
The European team consisted of 22 men and 19 women.

Men
 
 
 
 
 
 
 
 
 
 
 
 
 
 
 
 
 
 
 
 
 
 

Women

Format
All events were held in a short course pool (25 m).  Up to four swimmers per team took part in each of the twenty-six individual events. Five points were given to the winner, three to the runner-up and one for the third-place finisher, while fourth, fifth and sixth place received no points. In relay events, the winning team was awarded seven points and the losing team none.

Events were held in the following order with women's events first and men's events afterwards:

Day 1 (16 December, evening session)
 4 × 100 m medley relay
 400 m individual medley
 100 m freestyle
 200 m backstroke
 200 m breaststroke
 100 m butterfly
 400 m freestyle

Day 2 (17 December, afternoon session)
 800 m freestyle
 200 m freestyle
 100 m backstroke
 100 m breaststroke
 200 m butterfly
 50 m freestyle
 200 m individual medley
 4 × 100 m freestyle

Results 
The full results of the competition are listed below. One world record was set during the meet, in the women's 4 × 100 m medley relay, while five American records and one European record were beaten. The European relay teams were not eligible to set new records as they did not represent a single nation. Therefore, the European women's team did not set a new world record in the 4 × 100 m freestyle with their time of 3:27.53, even though they beat the standing record set by the Netherlands of 3:28.22.

Day 1

4 × 100 m medley relay 

Women

Natalie Coughlin set new American records for 50 m backstroke (26.98) and 100 m backstroke (55.97) with her split times.

Men

400 m individual medley 

Women

Men

100 m freestyle 

Women

Men

200 m backstroke 

Women

Men

200 m breaststroke 

Women

Men

100 m butterfly 

Women

Men

400 m freestyle 

Women

Men

Legend: WR – World record; AM – United States record; ER – European record

Day 2

800 m freestyle 

Women

Men

200 m freestyle 

Women

Men

100 m backstroke 

Women

Men

100 m breaststroke 

Women

Men

200 m butterfly 

Women

Men

50 m freestyle 

Women

Men

200 m individual medley 

Women

Men

4 × 100 m freestyle relay 

Women

Men

Legend: WR – World record; AM – United States record; ER – European record

Final score

See also 
 2011 in swimming

References 

2011 in swimming
Duel in the Pool
2011